The 1982 Michigan Wolverines football team was an American football team that represented the University of Michigan in the 1982 Big Ten Conference football season. In their 14th season under head coach Bo Schembechler, the Wolverines compiled an 8–4 record (8–1 against conference opponents), won the Big Ten championship, lost to UCLA in the 1983 Rose Bowl, and outscored all opponents by a total of 345 to 204.

The team's statistical leaders included tailback Lawrence Ricks with 1,388 rushing yards, flanker Anthony Carter with 844 receiving yards, and quarterback Steve Smith with 1,735 passing yards and 2,124 yards of total offense, and placekicker Ali Haji-Sheikh with 77 points scored.

Anthony Carter was selected as a consensus first-team All-American and won the Chicago Tribune Silver Football award as the Big Ten's most valuable player. Defensive back Keith Bostic received second-team All-America honors. Eight Michigan players (Carter, Bostic, running back Lawrence Ricks, center Tom Dixon, offensive guard Stefan Humphries, offensive tackle Rich Strenger, and linebackers Paul Girgash and Robert Thompson) received first-team honors on the 1982 All-Big Ten Conference football team.

Schedule

Season summary

Wisconsin

    
    
    
    
    

On September 11, 1982, Michigan defeated Wisconsin, 20–9, before a crowd of 104,932 at Michigan Stadium. One year earlier, Wisconsin had defeated No. 1 Michigan in the season opener. Lawrence Ricks rushed for 153 yards on 24 carries, including a four-yard touchdown run. Quarterback Steve Smith completed 12 of 19 passes for 107 yards and threw two interceptions. Senior flanker Anthony Carter caught only one pass. Wisconsin's touchdown, scored with 37 seconds left in the first half, followed a Smith interception at Michigan's 29-yard line. Wisconsin's defense was called for five personal foul penalties, and Wisconsin coach Dave McLain stated after the game that he believed the Michigan fans had intimidated the officials.

Notre Dame

    
    
    
    
    
    
    
    

On September 18, 1982, Michigan lost to Notre Dame, 23–17, before a crowd of 59,075 at Notre Dame Stadium in South Bend, Indiana. It was the first night game ever played at Notre Dame. Anthony Carter returned a punt 72 yards for a touchdown in the third quarter. Mike Johnston kicked three field goals for Notre Dame. Two fumbles by Steve Smith resulted in 10 Notre Dame points. He fumbled on the first play from scrimmage, leading to a Notre Dame field goal after two minutes of play.

After starting the first two games of the season, defensive back Brad Cochran quit the football team and left school. He returned to the team in 1983 and became a consensus All-American in 1985.

UCLA

    
    
    
    
    
    
    
    
    
    

On September 25, 1982, Michigan lost to UCLA, 31–27, before a crowd of 105,413 at Michigan Stadium. Michigan took a 21–0 lead in the second quarter, but UCLA quarterback Tom Ramsey completed 22 of 36 passes for 311 yards and two touchdowns to lead a 28-point comeback. After a slow start in the first two games of the season, Anthony Carter caught eight passes for 123 yards and a touchdown. Steve Smith completed 14 of 37 passes and was intercepted three times. Lawrence Ricks rushed for 98 yards. Michigan drove deep into UCLA territory in the final minute and had a first-and-goal from the eight-yard line, but Smith threw three incomplete passes into the end zone before time ran out.

Indiana

    
    
    
    
    
    

On October 2, 1982, Michigan defeated Lee Corso's Indiana Hoosiers by a 24–10 score before a crowd of 104,385 at Michigan Stadium. Michigan fans booed the conservative play-calling late in the first half. Michigan ran 62 times and passed only 10 times in the game. Lawrence Ricks led the Michigan backs with 124 yards and a touchdown on 22 carries. After the game, coach Schembechler said: "The booers can go to hell."

Michigan State

    
    
    
    
    
    
    
    

On October 9, 1982, Michigan defeated Michigan State, 31-17, before a crowd of 106,113 at Michigan Stadium. Michigan quarterback Steve Smith completed 10 of 20 passes for 182 yards and two touchdowns (one to Craig Dunaway and the other to Anthony Carter). Smith also rushed for a touchdown, and Lawrence Ricks tallied 95 rushing yards and a touchdown on 19 carries. Carter's touchdown set a new Big Ten record of 31 touchdown catches, breaking the prior record of 30 held by Jade Butcher. He also set a new Michigan career record with 134 receptions, breaking the previous record of 132 held by Jack Clancy. He also moved into second place among Michigan's career scoring leaders with 206 points, trailing only Tom Harmon with 237 points. The Detroit Free Press described the Spartans as "inept, disorganized, disspirited and injured both mentally and physically."

Iowa

    
    
    
    
    
    
    

On October 16, 1982, Michigan defeated Iowa, 29–7, before a crowd of 59,989 at Kinnick Stadium in Iowa City. After a scoreless first quarter, Michigan scored 12 points in the second quarter on a safety (Carlton Rose blocked an Iowa punt out of the end zone), a 44-yard field goal by Ali Haji-Sheikh, and an 11-yard touchdown pass from Steve Smith to split end Vince Bean. Haji-Sheikh added a second field goal in the third quarter, and tailback Rick Rogers scored two touchdowns in the fourth quarter. Lawrence Ricks gained 120 yards on 18 carries. Late in the fourth quarter, Iowa quarterback Chuck Long put the Hawkeyes on the scoreboard with an eight-yard touchdown pass to Mike Hufford. Long completed 19 of 32 passes for 220 yards.

Northwestern

    
    
    
    
    
    
    
    
    

On October 23, 1982, Michigan defeated Northwestern, 49–14, before a crowd of 34,121 at Dyche Stadium in Evanston, Illinois. Northwestern's freshman quarterback Sandy Schwab broke NCAA single-game records with 45 pass completions and 71 attempted passes, and also broke a Northwestern single-game record with 436 passing yards. Despite Schwab's numbers, Northwestern was unable to score until the fourth quarter. Michigan led, 42–0, at halftime. Michigan quarterback Steve Smith completed 10 of 12 passes for 203 yards and three touchdowns, while also rushing for 71 yards and two touchdowns. Anthony Carter caught three passes for 79 yards and two touchdowns. With the two touchdowns, Carter became Michigan's all-time touchdown leader with 36, breaking the previous record of 34 held by Rick Leach.

Minnesota

    
    
    
    
    
    
    
    
    
    

On October 30, 1982, Michigan defeated Minnesota, 52–14, before a crowd of 105,619 at Michigan Stadium. In the first quarter, Steve Smith Smith completed a 29-yard touchdown pass to Anthony Carter. Michigan added 24 points in the second quarter and 14 more in the third quarter. Smith completed 10 of 16 passes for 159 yards and three touchdowns, and Lawrence Ricks rushed for 135 yards on 18 carries. With the win, the Wolverines retained the Little Brown Jug for a fifth consecutive year.

Illinois

    
    
    
    
    
    

On November 6, 1982, Michigan defeated Illinois, 16–10, at Memorial Stadium in Champaign, Illinois. The crowd of 75,256 set a new Memorial Stadium record. Illinois was led by All-Big Ten quarterback Tony Eason.

Illinois drove down the field after the opening kickoff and scored on a 26-yard field goal by Mike Bass. With 6:44 remaining in the first quarter, Michigan took the lead on a 40-yard touchdown pass from Steve Smith to Anthony Carter. Carter caught the ball on a crossing pattern at the 25-yard and, with a good block from Vince Bean, sprinted down the sideline to the end zone.  After Evan Cooper intercepted an Eason pass near the end of the first quarter, Steve Smith led the Wolverines down the field, and Ali Haji-Sheikh kicked a 30-yard field goal. Later in the quarter, Eason threw a seven-yard touchdown pass to Oliver Martin, and the game was tied, 10–10, at halftime.

In the third quarter, Haji-Sheikh kicked field goals of 45 and 47 yards to retake the lead at 16–10. Late in the fourth quarter, Eason led the Illini 90 yards from their own eight-yard line to Michigan's two-yard line. With 27 seconds remaining, Illinois had a fourth-and-goal from the two, but a wall of Michigan's defenders stopped tailback Dwight Beverly for no gain.

Illinois out-gained Michigan, 515 yards to 354. Eason completed 28 of 47 passes for 272 yards, a touchdown, and two interceptions. Steve Smith completed six of 18 passes for 130 yards and a touchdown. Lawrence Ricks led Michigan's backs with 182 yards on 31 carries.  Anthony Carter caught five passes for 125 yards and also ran for 17 yards.

Purdue

    
    
    
    
    
    
    
    
    
    
    

On November 13, 1982, Michigan defeated Purdue, 52–21, before a crowd of 105,281 at Michigan Stadium. The game was broadcast nationally on CBS, and the win clinched the Big Ten title and Rose Bowl berth for Michigan. For the first time since 1971, the Michigan-Ohio State game did not determine the Big Ten championship.

In the first quarter, Michigan opened the scoring with a 48-yard touchdown pass from quarterback Steve Smith to flanker Anthony Carter. Still in the first quarter, Michigan drove down the field and scored on a four-yard run by tailback Lawrence Ricks.  In the second quarter, Al Sincich recovered a Boilermaker fumble at Purdue's 25-yard line to set up a 26-yard field goal by Ali Haji-Sheikh. The field goal was his 12th of the year, setting a new Michigan single-season record.

In the second quarter, Purdue's Mel Gray scored on a one-yard run to narrow Michigan's lead to 17–7. Michigan answered with a one-yard touchdown run by Steve Smith.  On the next possession Gray fumbled, and Keith Bostic recovered the ball at Purdue's 33-yard line. Ricks scored from the one, and Michigan led, 31–7, at halftime.

After a scoreless third quarter, the teams combined for 35 points in the fourth quarter.  Purdue scored on a four-yard pass from Scott Campbell to Greg Benson. Marion Body intercepted a Boilermaker pass at the Purdue 23-yard line and returned it to the five-yard line. Reserve tailback Kerry Smith scored on a one-yard run. John Lott intercepted another Purdue pass, and Smith threw a 62-yard touchdown pass to Anthony Carter.  Michigan led, 45-14. Freshman fullback Eddie Garrett scored Michigan's final touchdown.

In his final game at Michigan Stadium, Anthony Carter caught three passes for 123 yards, two of the catches for touchdowns. Lawrence Ricks led Michigan's backs with a career-high 196 rushing yards on 31 carries. Steve Smith completed nine of 13 passes for 184 yards and was intercepted once. Purdue quarterback Scott Campbell completed 29 of 49 passes for 331 yards with two touchdowns and two interceptions. Purdue committed a total of six turnovers on four fumbles and the two interceptions.

After the game, thousands of fans ran onto the field to tear down the newly-reinforced and supposedly "fan resistant" goalposts. Ann Arbor police defended the goal posts, and one fan and one officer were injured in the melee that followed. Fans succeeded in tearing down the south goal post, though the north post remained. Fans carried the south goal post out of the stadium, down State Street, and to the doorstep of university president Harold Shapiro. Shapiro posed for pictures with students and the goalpost.

Ohio State

    
    
    
    
    
    

On November 20, 1982, Michigan lost to Ohio State, 24–14, before a crowd of 90,252 at Ohio Stadium in Columbus, Ohio.

Michigan turned the ball over six times on three interceptions and three fumbles. The most costly turnover occurred in the fourth quarter with the score tied at 14–14. Michigan quarterback Steve Smith ran an option play  and pitched to Anthony Carter; Carter was hit hard by two Buckeye defenders and the ball popped loose and was recovered at Michigan's 14-yard line. After the Carter fumble, Ohio State ran three plays culminating with the game-winning touchdown on a one-yard run by Tim Spencer. Michigan coach Bo Schembechler defended Carter after the game: "We pitched the ball late, poor damn kid. That's a bad deal. One of those things. Ah, shoot."

An earlier fumble was the result of what Schembechler called Ohio State cheating.  Ohio State linebacker Marcus Marek shouted signals, mocking the cadence of Michigan's quarterback, and causing Michigan center Tom Dixon to snap too soon. Schembechler said his staff had seen Ohio State utilize the illegal technique on film and had read about it in a Columbus newspaper story. Schembechler said he alerted the officials to the tactic before the game, but no violation was called.

Smith completed 12 of 28 passes for 127 yards and was intercepted three times, while Ohio State quarterback Mike Tomczak completed 10 of 17 passes for 159 yards. Michigan running back Lawrence Ricks rushed for 110 yards and a touchdown on 27 carries, while Tim Spencer gained 124 yards and scored two touchdowns on 27 carries.

1983 Rose Bowl

    
    
    
    
    
    

On January 1, 1983, Michigan, ranked No. 19 by the AP, lost to No. 5 UCLA, 24–14, before a crowd of 104,991 at the 1983 Rose Bowl in Pasadena, California.

On Michigan's third play from scrimmage, All-Big Ten offensive tackle Rich Strenger sustained an injury to his knee and ankle and did not return to the game. After the game, Michigan coach Bo Schembechler said: "If there's one guy we couldn't lose, it was Strenger, and we lost him on the third play of the game. . . But I'm not trying to alibi, because if you're a good team, you adjust to your losses."

Late in the first quarter, UCLA drove 80 yards, aided by a pass interference penalty that resulted in a first-and-goal.  Tom Ramsey ran for the touchdown on a quarterback sneak from the one-yard line.

Early in the second quarter, Michigan quarterback Steve Smith led a drive to the UCLA 19-yard line, but a Smith pass was tipped up in the air and intercepted. On the next possession by Michigan, Smith suffered a separated shoulder when he was hit hard by Don Rogers after an eight-yard gain. Smith did not return to the game and was replaced at quarterback by Dave Hall. Prior to the Rose Bowl, Hall had completed seven of 14 passes, principally appearing in games where Michigan was well ahead.  Hall also lacked the mobility to lead Michigan's option offense.

Later in the second quarter, Michigan forced UCLA to punt from deep in its own territory, but Anthony Carter fumbled trying to grab the bouncing punt. The Bruins recovered at midfield and, seven plays later, John Lee kicked a 39-yard field goal with less than 30 seconds left in the half.

In the third quarter, Michigan drove 47 yards, capped by a one-yard touchdown pass from Hall to fullback Eddie Garrett on fourth down. Michigan trailed by only three points with 5:15 remaining in the third quarter. UCLA then responded with an 80-yard, 13-play drive during which Ramsey completed two third-down passes. The drive ended with a nine-yard touchdown run by tailback Danny Andrews.

Early in the fourth quarter, UCLA threatened to put the game out of reach, driving 65 yards, but the Wolverine defense held on fourth-and-goal from the one-yard line. However, when Michigan took over, Dave Hall was intercepted by Blanchard Montgomery who returned Hall's pass 11 yards for a touchdown. At that point, UCLA led by 17 points with eight minutes remaining in the game. After Montgomery's interception, Anthony Carter returned the kickoff to the 45-yard line. Hall then led the Wolverines down the field, completing a long throw to Craig Dunaway at the four-yard line, and then completing a touchdown pass to freshman fullback Dan Rice with 5:20 remaining in the game. Haji-Sheikh's attempted onside kick was grabbed by UCLA, and the Bruins ran the clock under two minutes before punting. Hall led the Wolverines to the UCLA 18-yard line, but time ran out before Michigan could advance further.

Tom Ramsey completed 18 of 25 passes for 162 yards. For Michigan, Dave Hall completed 13 of 24 passes for 155 yards, Lawrence Ricks rushed for 88 yards on 23 carries, and Craig Dunaway caught five passes for 110 yards.

Award season
Wide receiver Anthony Carter was a consensus All-American, having received first-team honors from American Football Coaches Association (AFCA), Associated Press (AP), Football Writers Association of America, United Press International, Gannett News Service (GNS), Newspaper Enterprise Association (NEA), The Sporting News, and the Walter Camp Football Foundation (WCFF).

Carter also won the Chicago Tribune Silver Football award as the most valuable player in the Big Ten Conference.  Carter edged out Illinois quarterback Tony Eason in close voting. Votes were cast by Big Ten coaches and officials and three representatives of the Chicago Tribune. Carter received 11 first-place votes to 10 for Eason. During his career, Carter set an NCAA record with an average of 17.4 yards per touch (including receptions, rushing carries, and kick returns). He also set Big Ten records with 3,017 receiving yards, 37 touchdown receptions, and 1,548 yards on kickoff returns.

Defensive back Keith Bostic was selected by both the AP and UPI as a second-team All-American.

Eight Michigan players were selected by the AP (media) and/or UPI (Big Ten coaches) as first or second-team players on the 1981 All-Big Ten Conference football team. They were: Anthony Carter (AP-1, UPI-1), Keith Bostic (AP-1, UPI-1), running back Lawrence Ricks (AP-1, UPI-1), offensive guard Stefan Humphries (AP-1, UPI-1), center Tom Dixon (AP-1, UPI-1), offensive tackle Rich Strenger (AP-1), linebacker Robert Thompson (AP-1, UPI-1), and linebacker Paul Girgash (AP-1, UPI-1). Four additional players received second-team honors: quarterback Steve Smith (AP-2), defensive lineman Winfred Carraway (UPI-2), linebacker Mike Boren (AP-2, UPI-2), and placekicker Ali Haji-Sheikh (AP-2, UPI-2).

Team awards were presented as follows:
Most Valuable Player: Anthony Carter
Meyer Morton Award: Stefan Humphries
John Maulbetsch Award: Mark Hammerstein
Frederick Matthei Award: Steve Smith
Arthur Robinson Scholarship Award: Craig Dunaway
Dick Katcher Award: Robert Thompson
Robert P. Ufer Award: Jerry Burgei

Personnel

Full roster

Letter winners, offense
Greg Armstrong, fullback, junior, Middletown, Ohio - started 2 games at fullback
Art Balourdos, center, sophomore, Chicago, Illinois - started 1 game at right offensive guard
Vincent Bean, split end, junior, Southfield, Michigan - started all 12 games at split end
Anthony Carter, flanker, senior, Riviera Beach, Florida - started all 12 games at flanker 
Milt Carthens, tight end, junior, Pontiac, Michigan
J. Nathaniel Davis, tailback, senior, Jamestown, New York
Rickey Davis, wide receiver, senior, Detroit, Michigan
Jerry Diorio, offensive guard, junior, Youngstown, Ohio - started 6 games at right offensive guard
Tom Dixon, center, junior, Fort Wayne, Indiana - started all 12 games at center 
Craig Dunaway, tight end, senior, Pittsburgh, Pennsylvania - started all 12 games at tight end
Joseph English, Detroit, Michigan
Eddie Garrett, fullback, freshman, Milwaukee, Wisconsin - started 1 game at fullback
Tom Garrity, offensive tackle, senior, Grafton, Wisconsin - started 5 games at right offensive tackle
David Hall, quarterback, junior, Livonia, Michigan
Mark Hammerstein, offensive line, freshman, Wapakoneta, Ohio
Mickey Hanlon, wide receiver, senior, Ann Arbor, Michigan
Gary "Duke" Haymes, fullback, Bellevue, Ohio
Stefan Humphries, offensive guard, junior, Broward, Florida - started all 12 games at left offensive guard 
Jerald Ingram, fullback, junior, Beaver, Pennsylvania
Doug James, offensive guard, junior, Louisville, Kentucky - started 6 games at right offensive tackle, 5 games at right offensive guard
Eric Kattus, tight end, sophomore, Cincinnati, Ohio
John Lott, defensive back, senior, Masury, Ohio - started 3 games at weak-side cornerback, 1 game at strong-side cornerback
Brian Mercer, tailback, sophomore, Cincinnati, Ohio
Clay Miller, offensive tackle, sophomore, Norman, Oklahoma - started 1 game at right offensive tackle
Joseph S. Mosketti, fullback, Hamilton, Ohio
Dan Rice, running back, freshman, Roxbury, Massachusetts - started 9 games at fullback
Lawrence Ricks, tailback, senior, Barberton, Ohio - started all 12 games at tailback
Scott Roberts, tight end, senior, Miami, Florida
Rick Rogers, running back, sophomore, Inkster, Michigan
Kerry Smith, running back, junior, Grand Rapids, Michigan
Steve Smith, quarterback, junior, Grand Blanc, Michigan - started all 12 games at quarterback
Rich Strenger, offensive tackle, senior, Grafton, Wisconsin - started all 12 games at left offensive tackle
Larry Sweeney, center, junior, Alma, Michigan

Letter winners, defense
Timothy Anderson, inside linebacker, junior, Ann Arbor, Michigan
Marion Body, defensive back, senior, Detroit, Michigan - started 5 games at weak-side cornerback  
Mike Boren, inside linebacker, junior, Columbus, Ohio - started all 12 games at inside linebacker 
Keith Bostic, strong safety, senior, Ann Arbor, Michigan - started all 12 games at strong safety
Kevin Brooks, defensive tackle, sophomore, Detroit, Michigan - started 7 games at defensive tackle
Jerry Burgei, defensive back, senior, Ottawa, Ohio - started all 12 games (11 at strong-side cornerback, 1 at weak-side cornerback)
Fritz Burgess, defensive back, junior, Pasadena, California
Winfred Carraway, defensive tackle, senior, Detroit, Michigan - started all 12 games at defensive tackle 
Brad Cochran, defensive back, sophomore, Royal Oak, Michigan - started 2 games at weak-side cornerback
Jeff Cohen, defensive back, senior, Farmington Hills, Michigan
Evan Cooper, defensive back, junior, Miami, Florida - started all 12 games at free safety
Vincent DeFelice, defensive tackle, junior, Trenton, Michigan
John Ferens, defensive back, junior, Toledo, Ohio
Tony Gant, linebacker, freshman, Fremont, Ohio - started 1 game at weak-side cornerback
Paul Girgash, linebacker, senior, Lakewood, Ohio - started all 12 games at inside linebacker 
Joe Gray, linebacker, sophomore, Detroit, Michigan
Mike Hammerstein, defensive tackle, sophomore, Wapakoneta, Ohio - started 1 game at defensive tackle
Thomas J. Hassel, outside linebacker, junior, Cincinnati, Ohio - started 1 game at outside linebacker
Dieter Heren, defensive back, freshman, Fort Wayne, Indiana
Jim Herrmann, inside linebacker, senior, Dearborn Heights, Michigan
Rich Hewlett, defensive back, senior, Plymouth, Michigan 
Louis Kovacs, defensive back, senior, Toledo, Ohio (father of 2012 team co-captain Jordan Kovacs)
Mike Lemirande, outside linebacker, senior, Grafton, Wisconsin 
John Lott, defensive back, senior, Masury, Ohio - started 3 games at weak-side cornerback, 1 game at strong-side cornerback
Rodney Lyles, outside linebacker, junior, Miami, Florida
Mike Mallory, inside linebacker, sophomore, DeKalb, Illinois
Dave Meredith, defensive tackle, junior, Sterling Heights, Michigan - started 4 games at defensive tackle
Andy Moeller, inside linebacker, freshman, Ann Arbor, Michigan
Sim Nelson, outside linebacker, sophomore, Fort Wayne, Indiana
Nathaniel Rodgers, middle guard, junior, Warren, Ohio
Carlton Rose, outside linebacker, junior, Ft. Lauderdale, Florida - started 11 games at outside linebacker
Alan Sincich, middle guard, sophomore, Cleveland, Ohio - started all 12 games at middle guard 
Robert Thompson, outside linebacker, senior, Blue Island, Illinois - started all 12 games at outside linebacker
Todd Triplett, outside linebacker, senior, Detroit, Michigan

Letter winners, special teams
Don Bracken, punter, junior, Thermopolis, Wyoming
Ali Haji-Sheikh, place-kicker, senior, Arlington, Texas

Professional football
The following players were claimed in the 1983 NFL Draft.

Statistics

Rushing

Passing

Receiving

Scoring

References

External links
  1982 Football Team -- Bentley Historical Library, University of Michigan Athletics History

Michigan
Michigan Wolverines football seasons
Big Ten Conference football champion seasons
Michigan Wolverines football